Joseph de Bray (1630, Haarlem – 1664, Haarlem), was a Dutch Golden Age painter.

Biography

According to the RKD he was born into an artistic family as the son of Salomon de Bray and Anna Westerbaen (sister of the painter Jan and the poet Jacob Westerbaen).  He was the brother of the painters Jan, Dirck, and Jacob de Bray.

He is known for fruit and flower still life paintings and some italianate landscapes. He died young 4 days after his father, probably from an outbreak of the plague in Haarlem.

References

Joseph de Bray on Artnet

1630 births
1664 deaths
Dutch Golden Age painters
Dutch male painters
Dutch still life painters
Artists from Haarlem